The second edition of the Audi Cup was a two-day association football tournament that featured four teams. It was played at the Allianz Arena in Munich, Germany. The competition hosted the defending champions Bayern Munich, the 2010 Copa Libertadores champions Internacional, the 2010–11 UEFA Champions League winners Barcelona and the 2007 FIFA Club World Cup champions Milan. The winners of the tournament were Barcelona, beating Bayern Munich 2–0 in the final. Internacional defeated Milan in the third place match after a penalty shoot-out.

Participating teams

Competition format
The competition took the format of a regular knock-out competition. The winners of each of the two matches on the first day competed against each other for the Audi Cup, whilst the two losing sides played in a third-place match. The trophy contested over two days, each day seeing two matches played back-to-back. The official matchups were announced on 8 May 2011.

Matches
All times are local (CEST; UTC+02:00).

Semi-finals

Third place play-off

Final

Goalscorers
3 goals
 Thiago (Barcelona)

2 goals
 Leandro Damião (Internacional)
 Zlatan Ibrahimović (Milan)

1 goal
 Jonathan dos Santos (Barcelona)
 Nei (Internacional)
 Andrés D'Alessandro (Internacional)
 Toni Kroos (Bayern Munich)
 Alexandre Pato (Milan)

Television broadcasters
The competition was broadcast in the United Kingdom on ITV4. It was also broadcast in other countries, including Rai Sport in Italy.

References

External links
 Official website

2011–12 in German football
Audi Cup